Tavakkolabad-e Darreh Deraz (also Romanized as Tavakkolābād-e Darreh Derāz; also known as Tavakkolābād and Vakīl Āqā) is a village in Baladarband Rural District, in the Central District of Kermanshah County, Kermanshah Province, Iran. At the 2006 census, its population was 7,429, in 1,572 families.

References 

Populated places in Kermanshah County